Vladislav Vikentyevich Korchits (1 September 1893 in Bogdanowicze, Slonim, now Belarus – 17 October 1966, Moscow) was a Soviet and Polish general. He supported the Bolshevik side during the Russian Revolution, joining the Red Army. He participated in the Polish-Soviet War. In the interwar period he graduated from the Mikhail Frunze Military Academy. He was imprisoned and tortured during the Great Purge, survived it and was reinstated afterward. He took part in World War II. From 1944 he was attached to the Polish Armed Forces in the East. After the war he remained in the People's Republic of Poland. He served in the Polish People's Army as the chief of Polish General Staff from 1 January 1945 to 18 January 1954. While in Poland, he joined the Polish Workers' Party, was the Deputy Minister of National Defense (1949/1950-?), and the deputy to the Polish parliament (Sejm) for the term 1952-1956. In 1954 he retired and returned to the Soviet Union. He died in Moscow.

References
Generał broni Władysław Korczyc 1893-1966,  MON 1980

External links
Korczyc Władysław (1893-1966), Polish Sejm members biographies
Biography in PWN Encyclopedia

1893 births
1966 deaths
People from Slonim District
People from Grodno Governorate
Communist Party of the Soviet Union members
Polish Workers' Party politicians
Members of the Central Committee of the Polish United Workers' Party
Soviet people of Polish descent
Soviet colonel generals
Polish generals
Russian military personnel of World War I
Soviet military personnel of the Russian Civil War
People of the Polish–Soviet War
Polish military personnel of World War II
Soviet officers in Polish Army 1943-1968
Frunze Military Academy alumni
Recipients of the Order of the Builders of People's Poland
Commanders with Star of the Order of Polonia Restituta
Knights of the Virtuti Militari
Recipients of the Order of the Cross of Grunwald, 2nd class
Recipients of the Order of Lenin
Recipients of the Order of the Red Banner
Recipients of the Order of Suvorov, 1st class
Recipients of the Order of Kutuzov, 2nd class